Noorani Basti is a locality of Hyderabad, in Sindh, Pakistan.

See also 
 Ilyasabad
 Latifabad

References 

Neighbourhoods of Hyderabad, Sindh